Mohammad Nouri (December 22, 1929 – July 31, 2010) was one of the foremost folk and pop singers in Iran. Before the 1979 Iranian Revolution, Nouri was relatively unknown among Iranian pop music lovers mainly because his string orchestral pop tunes hardly fit for disco and party entertainment, not to mention little exposure and publicity efforts on his part.

Biography 
Nouri studied English Language and Literature at the University of Tehran, but continued his professional career in music. He studied Persian music under Esmaeil Mehrtash and music theory and piano under Sirous Shahrdar and Fereidoun Farzaneh. In his singing style he was considered as a follower of Hossein Aslani and Naser Hosseini.

His song Jaan-e Maryam, Gol-e Maryam  (جان مریم، گل مریم), as well as his patriotic songs such as Journeys for the Fatherland and Iran, Iran, have been and are well known melodies and themes among three generations of Iranians from both before and after the 1979 Iranian Revolution. Also, Nouri had many notable students, including Sahar Moghadass and Reza Shirmarz.

See also 
 Music of Iran
 List of Iranian musicians

References

External links
Facebook Fanpage
 Mohammad Nouri: A Bridge between Iranian Folk and Pop Music, BBC Persian
His collaborations with Fariborz Lachini
His works

1929 births
2010 deaths
Iranian folk singers
Iranian pop singers
20th-century Iranian male singers
University of Tehran alumni
Burials at artist's block of Behesht-e Zahra
People from Rasht
Iranian Science and Culture Hall of Fame recipients in Music